Edakkad railway station (code: ETK) is a railway station in Kannur district, Kerala and falls under the Palakkad railway division of the Southern Railway zone, Indian Railways.

Trains stopping at Edakkad 
Towards Kannur:
 Kozhikode–Kannur Passenger
 Trissur–Kannur Passenger
 Kozhikode–Kannur Passenger
 Coimbatore–Kannur Fast Passenger

Towards Kozhikode:
 Kannur–Coimbatore Fast Passenger
 Mangaluru–Kozhikode Passenger
 Kannur–Shornur Passenger
 Kannur–Kozhikode Passenger

Railway stations in Kannur district
Railway stations opened in 1904
1904 establishments in India